Slovakia participated in the biennial classical music competition Eurovision Young Musicians twice and are yet to return to the contest.

Participation overview

See also
Slovakia in the Eurovision Song Contest

References

External links
 Eurovision Young Musicians

Countries in the Eurovision Young Musicians